The Kara class, Soviet designation Project 1134B Berkut B (golden eagle), was a class of guided missile cruisers (large anti-submarine warfare ship in Soviet classification) built in the Soviet Union for the Soviet Navy. The NATO lists the class as "cruisers" mainly due to the Metel (SS-N-14 Silex) anti-ship missile system capable of striking not only submarines, but also surface vessels.

Design
These ships were fitted as flagships with improved command, control and communications facilities. These are dedicated ASW ships with significant anti-aircraft capability including both SA-N-3 and SA-N-4 surface-to-air missiles.

The specifications for the class were issued in 1964 with the design being finalised in the late 1960s. The gas turbine engine was chosen instead of steam for greater efficiency and quietness, and because the main Soviet gas turbine plant had a long association with the Nikolayev shipyards.

The cruiser Azov was constructed as a trials ship for the SA-N-6 missile system and was also fitted with the associated Top Dome Radar. During the Cold War she was confined to the Black Sea.

Ships
All the ships were built by the 61 Communards Shipyard in Mykolaiv (Nikolayev).

See also
List of ships of the Soviet Navy
List of ships of Russia by project number

References

  Also published as

External links

 Article
 FAS.org
 Kara Class Kerch Photoalbum
 warfare.ru page
 Global Security.org
  All Russian Kara Class Cruisers - Complete Ship List

Cruiser classes
 
Ship classes of the Russian Navy